Orientering was a Norwegian newspaper which was initially published in December 1952 as an alternative voice. It was absorbed into Ny Tid in 1975.

There were many reasons for establishing the newspaper, but the most important was perhaps that it had become very difficult to express viewpoints which were critical of NATO and capitalism in general.

In 1953 the group from the Labor Party's left wing won, led by Karl Evang. The editor and spokesman for the group was Sigurd Evensmo, with Finn Gustavsen as the co-editor. They also had the support of the Labor Party, such as the party's first Prime Minister, Christopher Hornsrud.

The group's party line was an alternative to the third way, critical of both Moscow and Washington DC. Orientering was therefore opposed to Norwegian membership in NATO, but also gave extensive independence in the imperialism suitable for analysis of international relations. The main current of Norwegian socialism in the 1950s was polarized between Moscow (Communist Party of Norway) and Washington (Norwegian Labour Party). Orientering was almost silent about the Labor Party's newspapers, something which contributed to increasing interest.

The newspaper was characterized by foreign affairs from the beginning. Questions regarding domestic policy grew in large degree after Finn Gustavsen became the editor in 1957. It climaxed with the question of the proposed stockpiling of atomic weaponry in Norway when the national congress in the Labor Party passed a resolution in 1961 allowing for this.

The key people in the inner circle of Orientering considered starting a new party, which would become a reality through the establishment of the Socialist People's Party in 1961. Gustavsen was one of the party's first two representatives to the Norwegian Parliament and relinquished the role of editor to Evang. Orientering became the advocate of the Socialist People's Party; at the same time the newspaper doubled its frequency to releasing a new issue weekly. The Socialist People's Party did not formally take over the newspaper until 1973. The editor from 1965 on was Kjell Cordtsen.

In 1975-1975 assembly meetings were arranged between the parties on the left after the Socialist People's Party's success in the election of 1973. The establishment of the Socialist Left Party was approved and would replace the Socialist People's Party, the Norwegian Communist Party (who later withdrew) and the Democratic Socialists with support from a number of independent socialists.

In connection with this process, Orientering was discontinued and absorbed into the Socialist Left Party's new party newspaper, Ny Tid. From the beginning the circulation was several thousand, but this slowly grew to around 19,000 in 1974, while the last issue reached 16,000. The community surrounding Orientering continued in and around Ny Tid.

Editors
 Sigurd Evensmo 1952–1959
 Finn Gustavsen 1959–1961
 Sigurd Evensmo 1961–1965
 Kjell Cordtsen 1965–1975

References

1953 establishments in Norway
1975 disestablishments in Norway
Defunct newspapers published in Norway
Newspapers published in Oslo
Norwegian-language newspapers
Newspapers established in 1953
Publications disestablished in 1975
Socialist Left Party (Norway) newspapers
Socialist newspapers